This article is about the records and statistics of the football section of IFK Göteborg. For the statistics of other sections, see IFK Göteborg (sports club).

Honours

Domestic 
 Swedish Champions
 Winners (18): 1908, 1910, 1918, 1934–35, 1941–42, 1957–58, 1969, 1982, 1983, 1984, 1987, 1990, 1991, 1993, 1994, 1995, 1996, 2007

League 
 Allsvenskan:
 Winners (13): 1934–35, 1941–42, 1957–58, 1969, 1982, 1984, 1990, 1991, 1993, 1994, 1995, 1996, 2007
 Runners-up (13): 1924–25, 1926–27, 1929–30, 1939–49, 1979, 1981, 1986, 1988, 1997, 2005, 2009, 2014, 2015
 Svenska Serien:
 Winners (5): 1912–13, 1913–14, 1914–15, 1915–16, 1916–17
 Fyrkantserien:
 Winners (2): 1918, 1919
 Mästerskapsserien:
 Winners (1): 1991
 Division 2
 Winners (3): 1938–39, 1950–51, 1976
 Runners-up (2): 1972, 1975

Cups 
 Svenska Cupen:
 Winners (8): 1978–79, 1981–82, 1982–83, 1991, 2008, 2012–13, 2014–15, 2019–20
 Runners-up (5): 1985–86, 1998–99, 2004, 2007, 2009
 Allsvenskan play-offs:
 Winners (5): 1982, 1983, 1984, 1987, 1990
 Runners-up (1): 1985
 Svenska Mästerskapet:
 Winners (3): 1908, 1910, 1918
 Svenska Supercupen:
 Winners (1): 2008
 Runners-up (4): 2009, 2010, 2013, 2015
 Kamratmästerskapen:
 Winners (11): 1909, 1910, 1912, 1913, 1914, 1915, 1920, 1921, 1922, 1924, 1940
 Runners-up (2): 1906, 1908

European 
 UEFA Cup:
 Winners (2): 1981–82, 1986–87
 European Cup/UEFA Champions League:
 Semi-finals (2): 1985–86, 1992–93
 Quarter-finals (3): 1984–85, 1988–89, 1994–95
 UEFA Cup Winners' Cup:
 Quarter-finals (1): 1979–80
 Royal League:
 Runners-up (1): 2004–05

Doubles, trebles and quadruples

Doubles 
 Fyrkantserien and Svenska Mästerskapet (Swedish Champions):
 Winners (1): 1918
 Allsvenskan play-offs (Swedish Champions) and Svenska Cupen:
 Winners (1): 1983
 Allsvenskan and Allsvenskan play-offs (Swedish Champions):
 Winners (2): 1984, 1990
 Svenska Cupen and Svenska Supercupen:
 Winners (1): 2008

Trebles 
 Allsvenskan, Allsvenskan play-offs (Swedish Champions) and the UEFA Cup:
 Winners (1): 1987
 Allsvenskan, Mästerskapsserien (Swedish Champions) and Svenska Cupen:
 Winners (1): 1991

Quadruples 
 Allsvenskan, Allsvenskan play-offs (Swedish Champions), Svenska Cupen and the UEFA Cup:
 Winners (1): 1982

Records 
 Home victory, Allsvenskan: 9-1 vs. IK Sleipner, 10 May 1925; 8-0 vs. Hammarby IF, 2 June 1925; 8-0 vs. Stattena IF, 21 April 1930
 Away victory, Allsvenskan: 9-2 vs. IFK Eskilstuna, 8 October 1933; 7-0 vs. IK Sleipner, 20 April 1941
 Home loss, Allsvenskan: 2-9 vs. Malmö FF, 10 September 1949
 Away loss, Allsvenskan: 0-7 vs. IFK Norrköping, 1 May 1960
 Highest attendance, Nya Ullevi: 52,194 vs. Örgryte IS, 3 June 1959
 Highest attendance, Gamla Ullevi: 31,064 vs. GAIS, 27 May 1955
 Highest attendance, Slottsskogsvallen: 21,580 vs. AIK, 25 October 1931
 Highest attendance, The New Gamla Ullevi: 18,276 vs Djurgårdens IF
 Highest average attendance, season: 23,796, 1977
 Most appearances, total: 609, Mikael Nilsson 1987–2001
 Most appearances, Allsvenskan: 348, Bengt Berndtsson 1951–1967
 Most goals scored, total: 333, Filip Johansson 1924–1934
 Most goals scored, Allsvenskan: 180, Filip Johansson 1924–1934
 Most goals scored, season, Allsvenskan: 39, Filip Johansson 1924/25

Footnotes 

Records
IFK Goteborg